Palle Christensen (27 December 1902 – 13 August 1995) was a Danish footballer. He played in eight matches for the Denmark national football team from 1926 to 1928.

References

External links
 

1902 births
1995 deaths
Danish men's footballers
Denmark international footballers
Footballers from Copenhagen
Association football defenders
Akademisk Boldklub players